The  Military Bishopric of Bolivia is a Latin Church military ordinariate of the Catholic Church. Immediately exempt to the Holy See, it provides pastoral care to Catholics serving in the Bolivian Armed Forces and their families.

History
It was created as a military vicariate on 19 March 1961, with the first military vicar appointed on 26 July 1961. It was elevated to a military ordinariate on 21 July 1986. The military ordinary's seat is located at the Cathedral of Our Lady of Luján (Catedral Nuestra Señora de Luján) in the Irpavi district of the city of La Paz.

Office holders

Military vicars
 Luis Aníbal Rodríguez Pardo (appointed 26 July 1961 – translated to the Archdiocese of Santa Cruz de la Sierra 30 July 1975)
 René Fernández Apaza (appointed 30 July 1975 – became military ordinary 21 July 1986)

Military ordinaries
 René Fernández Apaza (appointed 21 July 1986 – resigned 17 May 1986)
 Mario Lezana Vaca (appointed 17 May 1986 – retired 14 April 2000)
 Manuel Revollo Crespo, Coadjutor bishop, (8 September 1993 – retired 14 April 2000)
 Gonzalo Ramiro del Castillo Crespo, O.C.D. (appointed 14 April 2000 – retired 4 April 2012)
 Oscar Omar Aparicio Céspedes (4 April 2012 – translated to the Archdiocese of Cochabamba 24 September 2014)
 Fernando Bascopé Müller (since 24 September 2014)

References

External links
 Obispado Castrense de Bolivia (GCatholic.org)

Bolivia
Bolivia
Bolivia–Holy See relations
1961 establishments in Bolivia
La Paz